This will be the third UEMOA Tournament contest. It is a competition for domestic-league football players from the eight UEMOA member countries: Mali, Côte d'Ivoire, Burkina Faso, Niger, Togo, Benin, Senegal and Guinea-Bissau.

The Togolese Football Federation announced their intention to host the tournament at Lomé but the tournament was hosted in Benin.

Group A

Fixtures

Table

Group B

Fixtures

Table

Final

References

External links
Official Site - https://web.archive.org/web/20090131052428/http://www.tournoiuemoa.com//

2009 in African football
2009
2009
2009 in Ivorian football
Foo